The Santa Maria de Mayan Parish Church, commonly known as the Itbayat Church, is a historic church in Itbayat, Batanes, Philippines.

Background

The original structure of the Santa Maria de Mayan Church was made of wood. The original wooden church was built from 1853 to 1858 and was placed under the patronage of the Immaculate Conception. The current church building was built by the Dominicans. The construction of the church building was started during the administration of Fr. Manuel Blasco in 1872. It was completed in 1888 and the church was blessed by Blasco.

The church building sustained major damage during the Batanes earthquake of July 27, 2019 with its belfry tower falling off.

References

Roman Catholic churches in Batanes
Churches in the Roman Catholic Territorial Prelature of Batanes